Josef-Georg Auer (born 12 June 1965) is an Austrian wrestler. He competed in the men's freestyle 57 kg at the 1988 Summer Olympics.

References

External links
 

1965 births
Living people
Austrian male sport wrestlers
Olympic wrestlers of Austria
Wrestlers at the 1988 Summer Olympics
People from Hallein District
Sportspeople from Salzburg (state)